The S4G reactor is a naval reactor used by the United States Navy to provide electricity generation and propulsion on warships.  The S4G designation stands for:

 S = Submarine platform
 4 = Fourth generation core designed by the contractor
 G = General Electric was the contracted designer

This nuclear reactor is the shipboard equivalent of the S3G reactor.

References

United States naval reactors